The 2004 Big Ten Conference football season was the 109th season for the Big Ten Conference.

Rankings

Bowl games

See also
 2004 All-Big Ten Conference football team

References